The Olympus IR-500  is a 4.0-megapixel ultra-compact digital camera introduced by Olympus Corporation in 2004.

It features a 360° swivelling 2.5" LCD display, a 2.8x zoom lens, and 11x digital zoom in an ultra-compact mixed metal and plastic body. The peculiar disposition of the display allows for an enhanced hip-height photo composition (to picture children or low height objects) and auto-portrait mode (allowing the photographer to see the composition).

This camera was meant to be a part of a new digital system by Olympus thought to avoid the use of a personal computer. Named Olympus Easy Imaging System or i:robe, this camera was supplied with a cradle which allows the connection of a 40 GiB hard disk drive (S-HD-100; directly) and a photographic printer (P-S100; through USB). The cradle also allows the typical functions of recharging and connection to an external screen via RCA cable (with sound). The connection to a personal computer is made through a USB cable attached to the cradle.

Additional Specifications
The lens is an Olympus aspherical glass zoom lens 6.2 – 17.3 mm. The 2.8x zoom is equivalent to 40-112mm in 35 mm photography. The camera has a built-in flash.
Movies with sound can be recorded, the recording time is dependent on the xD card capacity. They are in QuickTime ( .mov) format. Recording at 320x240 the resultant movie has 30 frame/s, at any other resolution the framerate drops to 15 frame/s. The camera uses an Olympus Li-12B battery.

Sample photos

External links

Olympus Europa Camera Specifications
Olympus IR-500 Press Release

IR-500
Cameras introduced in 2004